Fair Game from PRI with Faith Salie was a satirical news and entertainment program produced and distributed by PRI. Episodes aired weekday evenings on public radio stations and were made available online as podcasts. 

The program was hosted by Faith Salie and featured interviews with celebrities and newsmakers, live music, and regular appearances by comedians. It often asked for listener feedback and contributions via its website. Regularly occurring segments included Why Do They Hate Us?, Seemingly Simple Solutions to Intractable Problems, and Bathed in Glory. Fair Game was intended to bring in a younger audience for public radio. According to PRI, the program was aired on about 25 public radio stations and received approximately 140,000 weekly listeners on average, as well as 100,000 monthly downloads of its podcasts. 

The program was featured in The New York Times in June 2007.  

Fair Game ceased broadcast for financial reasons on May 30, 2008, after 17 months on air.

References

External links 

Public Radio International Website

Public Radio International programs
American comedy radio programs
Experimental radio

2007 radio programme debuts 
2008 radio programme endings